Wang Jin (born 13 September 1972) is a Chinese former judoka. She competed at the 1996 Summer Olympics in Women's 52 kg (half lightweight) competition.

References

1972 births
Living people
Judoka at the 1996 Summer Olympics
Olympic judoka of China
Sportspeople from Wenzhou
Asian Games medalists in judo
Chinese female judoka
Asian Games bronze medalists for China
Medalists at the 1994 Asian Games
Judoka at the 1994 Asian Games
20th-century Chinese women
21st-century Chinese women